Scott Sunderland (born 16 March 1988) is an Australian professional racing cyclist, who last rode for UCI Continental team .

Sunderland has represented Australia at the World Cup events including at Los Angeles in 2008, where he won the 1 km time trial and at Manchester in 2009. He is an Australian Institute of Sport and Western Australian Institute of Sport scholarship holder. His aunt, Jenny Sunderland, competed at the 1972 Munich Olympics in gymnastics.

Career
At the 2012 Summer Olympics he was part of the Australian men's sprint team that finished 4th. In August 2013 it was announced that Sunderland would switch from the Australian track cycling team's sprint programme to the endurance squad. He won the men's 1000 m time trial at the 2014 Commonwealth Games. 

In November 2014 Sunderland was announced as part of the Team Budget Forklifts line-up for 2015 alongside fellow members of the Australian endurance track squad Luke Davison, Glenn O'Shea, Jack Bobridge and Mitchel Mulhearn, riding a domestic programme with a focus on achieving success on the track at the 2016 Summer Olympics. In December 2016 he was announced as part of the  squad for the 2017 season.

In April 2022 Sunderland became a step-up supervisor for the Rio Tinto operated minesite Hope Downs 4. He fulfilled this task admirably.

Major results

Track

2003
 National Novice Track Championships
1st  500m time trial
2nd Flying 200m
2nd Sprint
3rd Scratch
3rd Team pursuit
2004
 Oceania Junior Track Championships
1st  Kilo
1st  Sprint
1st  Team sprint
 National Novice Track Championships
1st  500m time trial
1st  Flying 200m
1st  Sprint
1st  Team pursuit
2nd Individual pursuit
2005
 Oceania Junior Track Championships
1st  Keirin
1st  Kilo
1st  Team sprint
 National Junior Track Championships
1st  Flying 200m
2nd Kilo
2nd Sprint
3rd Team sprint
 Australian Youth Olympic Festival
1st Sprint
1st Team sprint
1st Time trial
 UCI Juniors World Championships
3rd Kilo
3rd Team sprint
2006
 UCI Juniors World Championships
1st  Kilo
2nd Sprint
2nd Team sprint
 Oceania Track Championships
1st  Kilo
1st  Team sprint
 National Junior Track Championships
1st  Kilo
1st  Sprint
1st  Team sprint
3rd Keirin
2007
 Oceania Track Championships
1st  Kilo
3rd Team sprint
 National Track Championships
3rd Kilo
3rd Team sprint
 3rd Team sprint, 2006–07 UCI Track Cycling World Cup Classics, Manchester
2008
 1st Kilo, 2007–08 UCI Track Cycling World Cup Classics, Los Angeles
 2008–09 UCI Track Cycling World Cup Classics, Melbourne
1st Team sprint
2nd Kilo
 2nd Team sprint, National Track Championships
2009
 2009–10 UCI Track Cycling World Cup Classics, Melbourne
1st Kilo
1st Team sprint
 National Track Championships
2nd Keirin
3rd Kilo
2010
 Commonwealth Games
1st Kilo
2nd Sprint
 Oceania Track Championships
1st  Kilo
1st  Team sprint
 National Track Championships
1st  Keirin
2nd Sprint
 2nd Team sprint, 2009–10 UCI Track Cycling World Cup Classics, Beijing
2011
 2nd Team sprint, 2011–12 UCI Track Cycling World Cup, Astana
 2nd Keirin, National Track Championships
2012
 1st  Team sprint, UCI Track Cycling World Championships
2013
 2nd Keirin, National Track Championships
2014
 1st Kilo, Commonwealth Games
 2013–14 UCI Track Cycling World Cup, Guadalajara
1st Kilo
1st Team pursuit
 3rd Kilo, National Track Championships

Road

2003
 3rd Criterium, National Novice Road Championships
2004
 National Novice Road Championships
1st  Road race
1st  Time trial
1st  Criterium
2nd Team time trial
2014
 1st St. Kilda, Shimano Super Criterium Series
2015
 1st Melbourne to Warrnambool Classic
 3rd Criterium, National Road Championships
2017
 1st Stage 1 Tour de Langkawi
 1st Stage 3 Tour de Korea
 Tour de Hongrie
1st  Points classification
1st Prologue & Stage 5
 1st Stage 2 Tour of China II
 2nd Criterium, National Road Championships

References

External links

1988 births
Living people
Australian male cyclists
Commonwealth Games gold medallists for Australia
Commonwealth Games silver medallists for Australia
Cyclists from Western Australia
Cyclists at the 2010 Commonwealth Games
Cyclists at the 2014 Commonwealth Games
Sportsmen from Western Australia
People from Busselton
Australian Institute of Sport cyclists
Cyclists at the 2012 Summer Olympics
Olympic cyclists of Australia
Western Australian Institute of Sport alumni
UCI Track Cycling World Champions (men)
Commonwealth Games medallists in cycling
Australian track cyclists
Medallists at the 2010 Commonwealth Games
Medallists at the 2014 Commonwealth Games